Jeffery Flynn Jordan (November 23, 1943 – October 2, 2022) was an American professional football player who was a defensive back for three seasons in the National Football League (NFL) for the Minnesota Vikings. He played college football for the Tulsa Golden Hurricane.

Early life and education
Jordan was born on November 23, 1943, in San Antonio, Texas to Betty Flynn Jordan and Leroy Marion. He grew up in Bristow, Oklahoma, and attended Bristow High School there, where he excelled academically and played multiple sports, including football, basketball, and golf. In football, he played quarterback and earned all-state as well as Prep All-America honors. As a student, Jordan was class salutatorian and class president as a sophomore and senior.

Jordan was given a full scholarship to the University of Tulsa for his football talents, and played several seasons as a two-way player. He twice was named All-Missouri Valley Conference and still holds several school records, including the longest interception return in team history (97 yards, against Memphis State in 1963) and the single-game and career records for interception return yards. During his junior year, 1963, Jordan caught a 98-yard touchdown reception, which set the record at the time for longest play in Tulsa history. As a senior in 1964, he was named team captain and intercepted nine passes, being considered one of the "finest players in the country" while leading his team to a win in the Bluebonnet Bowl.

Jordan graduated in 1965 with a degree in industrial psychology and was a finalist that year for a Rhodes Scholarship, although he ultimately did not win it. He was inducted in 1988 to the Tulsa Athletics Hall of Fame.

Professional career
Jordan was selected in the eighth round (107th overall) of the 1965 NFL Draft by the Minnesota Vikings and in the 15th round (114th overall) of the 1965 AFL Draft by the Denver Broncos, and chose to join the former. As a rookie, Jordan appeared in 12 out of 14 games and recorded four interceptions, which he returned for 45 yards. He had two games with two interceptions, gaining 20 yards off them in their week 12 loss to the Green Bay Packers and 25 in their week 14 win over the Chicago Bears. He also made one fumble recovery and played as a starter in four matches.

In his second NFL season, Jordan played in all 14 games as a backup free safety, helping the Vikings win four matches. He retired prior to the  season, and finished his career with a total of 37 games played and four interceptions in three seasons.

During his National Football League career, Jordan was nicknamed "The Blade" due to his "tall, thin stature" being likened to a blade of grass.

Later life and death
Jordan's first wife was killed in a plane crash while traveling to a Vikings exhibition game in 1966. He remarried in 1968; quarterback Fran Tarkenton served as best man.

After retiring from professional football, Jordan became a businessman with Merrill Lynch, Pierce, Fenner & Smith and served with the firm until his retirement in 2018 after 50 years with them. He served as resident manager for the South Tulsa office for two decades and additionally was a perennial member with the Chairman's Club. He also was a mentor with the business and "had a huge impact on dozens of advisors," according to Tulsa World.

Jordan died on October 2, 2022, at age 78.

Notes

Explanatory notes

Citations 

1943 births
2022 deaths
American football defensive backs
American football safeties
Minnesota Vikings players
People from Bristow, Oklahoma
Players of American football from Oklahoma
Players of American football from San Antonio
Tulsa Golden Hurricane football players